Lobelia is an unincorporated community in Pocahontas County, West Virginia, United States.

The community was named after the Lobelia flowers near the original town site.

References

Unincorporated communities in Pocahontas County, West Virginia
Unincorporated communities in West Virginia